Niels Samuel Hausgaard (born 31 August 1944) is a Danish singer, songwriter and comedian. He is best known for his songs and understated comedy which often combine dry observations on the human condition with the trials and tribulations of life in a welfare state. Originally, Hausgaard spoke with a distinct dialect in his shows, vendelbomål, which has become something of a trademark during his sets, but in recent years it has been somewhat toned down.

Originally from Hirtshals, he now lives in Hundelev. Both towns are situated in Vendsyssel, Region Nordjylland, Denmark.

Awards and honors 
In Denmark, Hausgaard has been awarded several prizes for his contribution to Danish culture.

 2001 and 2004, Best TV entertainment
 2006, The Gelsted Prize 
 2006, Gelsted-Kirk-Scherfig Prize
 2006, Årets Sangskriver
 2012, Den Gyldne Grundtvig

The prize in 2006 by Gelsted-Kirk-Scherfig-Fonden, included 25,000 Danish kroner (about 5,000 US dollars), but he gave the money to the newspaper Dagbladet Arbejderen in an effort to support critical journalism.

Discography
1974 – Et Portræt
1975 – Til Ane
1977 – Men det går jo nok
1979 – Kunst
1982 – Når alt kommer til alt
1983 – Han tog realen med
1985 – Kom lad os danse
1988 – Som jeg altid plejer at sige
1991 – I fornuftens land
1992 – En halv time tidligere
2006 – Flyv så

Literature 
  A portrait.

Notes and references

External links

 Niels Hausgaard homepage
 

1944 births
Living people
Danish male singers
Danish male comedians
People from Hirtshals